The Centre for Internet and Society (CIS) is a Bengaluru-based non-profit multidisciplinary research organization. CIS works on digital pluralism, public accountability and pedagogic practices, in the field of the Internet and Society.

Wikimedia Projects

The Wikimedia Foundation granted a project to CIS to promote and support the Indic language Wikimedia’s Indic language free knowledge projects, including Wikipedia in Indic languages and English. The grant is also aimed to support wider distribution of Wikimedia’s free knowledge within India. The award amount for the first year of the two-year project was Rs. 11 million (US $200,000).

Swatantra 2014 
CIS supported and participated in Swatantra 2014, the fifth international free software conference event, organized at Thiruvananthapuram, Kerala from 18 to 20 December 2014.

References

External links

 
 
 
 
 

Non-profit organisations based in India
Think tanks based in India
Research institutes in Bangalore
Internet-related organizations
Year of establishment missing